Ribadavia is a town and municipality located in the southwest of the province of Ourense, autonomous community of Galicia, Spain. The urban area lies on the right bank of the Miño river and the last course of the Avia river. It is the capital of the comarca of the Ribeiro.

The town was declared a Historic-Artistic ensemble in 1947. Near the Campo da Feira, one can find the ruins of the castle of the Sarmientos, the Counts of Ribadavia, dating from the fifteenth century. It still preserves the interior, towers and the walls. Parts of the walls that surrounded the town are also still standing.  Inside the old quarter (casco vello/Barrio Xudeu), one can visit the main square (Praza Maior) with interesting buildings like the sixteenth-century town hall. There are also buildings remaining from what was once a large Jewish quarter, including a synagogue.

All the economic life of the comarca of the Ribeiro has centered on, since the twelfth century, the vines first brought by the monks of Cluny who accompanied the first count of Galicia, Raymond of Burgundy. Today, the wine is commercialised under the protected designation of origin Ribeiro.

Bibliography 
  Leopoldo Meruéndano Arias, Los Judíos de Ribadavia y orígen de las cuatro parroquias.
  Samuel Eiján, Historia de Ribadavia y sus alrededores.

References

External links 
 Ribadavia's City Hall Official Page
 Ribadavia's Tourism Page
 Recreating Sephardic Culture in a Galician Town

Municipalities in the Province of Ourense
Religion in Galicia (Spain)